Marin Academy (familiarly known as MA) is a private college preparatory high school in  San Rafael, California. Located on the campus that for decades housed the San Rafael Military Academy prior to its closure, Marin Academy was founded in 1971 with 118 faculty members and a student body of 449.
Marin Academy is one of the most competitive private high schools in the Bay Area. In the 2015–2016 school year, Marin Academy accepted only one in four students who applied.

The cost of attendance at Marin Academy for the 2021–22 school year is $53,086.

Curriculum

MA requires students to take two years of one of its performing or visual arts programs, four years of English, three years of History, three years of Mathematics, three years of Science (Biology, Chemistry, and one Physics course are required), and two semesters of Human Development, a health and social awareness class. In addition to classroom instruction, Marin Academy students undertake a number of non-traditional learning experiences such as minicourse, the Outings program,  end-of-year projects (EOY), wilderness quest, and mandatory senior speeches or senior arts performances. Another unique program is the Marin Academy Research Collaborative (MARC), where students conduct independent research during their junior and senior years.  The student body sustains many socially conscious student organizations and has been active in politics in Marin. The school conducts annual conferences and workshops on equality and social justice, called the Conference on Democracy and has a tradition of seniors delivering speeches to school assemblies.

Academics
Marin Academy is an academically focused school, with a student-to-teacher ratio of 9:1 and an average class size of 15. More than two-thirds of the faculty hold advanced degrees. More than 99% of Marin Academy graduates go on to attend a four-year college or university.

Travis Brownley, an educator who was the dean of the Groton School, was appointed the Head of School in 2008 following the departure of the previous head of school, Bodie Brizendine, who had led the school for 12 years, and Dick Drew, who served as interim head of school. The Bodie Brizendine Leadership Center (BBLC), a centrally located building on campus, houses faculty offices, math classrooms, and the school cafeteria.

Athletics
Marin Academy has developed a mid athletics program, highlighted by successes in soccer, cross country, boys' lacrosse, boys' water polo, and girls' volleyball. The school competes in The Bay Counties League (BCL) within the North Coast Section (NCS). During the COVID era, the swimming and water polo teams were members of The Marin County Athletic League (MCAL).

Marin Academy has won 11 North Coast Section championships in boys' soccer - 2000, 2001, 2006, 2007, 2008, 2010, 2012, 2014, 2017, 2018, 2019 and 2022 - and is a regular contender for regional championships. Girls' varsity soccer won the BCL and placed second in the North Coast Section Championship, losing to the Branson High School 4–2, in 2002. In 2006, the boys' soccer team won their third NCS championship in a match against University High School. Tied 1-1 through overtime, the NCS championship game was decided by penalty kicks, in which MA won 5–4. MA also defeated University in the BCL finals that year. In 2007, MA and University again matched up in the BCL and NCS championships, with UHS winning BCL and MA winning NCS 2–0. In 2008 MA and University were matched up once again in the BCL final and the Wildcats defeated the Devils 2–0. The two schools are rivals.

The girls' soccer team has won the last 6 BCL titles from 2016 to 2022 (undefeated against league opponents in the last 4 seasons) as well as ones in 2002 and 2010. In 2019 and in 2020 they advanced to NCS finals against Cardinal Newman and to CIF finals against Branson, coming up a goal short in 3 of the games and a penalty kick in the other. In 2022 MA girls soccer won their first NCS title.

The girls' volleyball team won the state and NCS division V championships in 2004, after losing to University High School in both the NCS and Northern California championship games the year before. In the 2022 fall season the team won the NCS title.

In the 2012 spring season, the Girls' Varsity Swim Team set the first North Coast Section record in Marin Academy history, with a time of 1:34.82 in the 200 yard freestyle relay. The girls placed fifth overall at NCS, first out of Marin County teams, and first out of schools with fewer than one thousand students.

The Marin Academy boys' water polo team placed first in NCS DII in 2017 after defeating Alameda High School 13–8. In 2021 the team placed second in NCS DII.

The Marin Academy Cross Country team placed first in NCS DII in 2015 and placed second in the California State Championships D V in both 2013 and 2015.

Current athletics offered include (but are not limited to):

Fall Sports
 Cross Country
 Girls' Volleyball
 Boys' and Girls' Waterpolo
 Girls' Tennis
 Girls' Golf 

Winter Sports
 Boys' and Girls' Basketball
 Boys' and Girls' Soccer

Spring Sports
 Baseball
 Boys' and Girls' Swimming
 Boys' and Girls' Lacrosse
 Boys' and Girls' Track and Field
 Boys' Golf
 Boys' Tennis

Notable alumni
The following people attended Marin Academy (the year shown is their year of graduation or, for non-graduates, the year that their class graduated)
 Rozzi Crane ('09) – singer-songwriter
 Buck Ellison ('06) – artist
 Luke Esterkyn ('90), Greg Gueldner ('90), John McDermott ('91) – members of the band Stroke 9
 Alexandra McCullagh ('05) – Member of the San Francisco Ballet
 Rumi Neely ('00) – fashion blogger at Fashion Toast
 Carré Otis ('87) – actress and model
 Ruth Parasol ('84) – co-founder PartyGaming
 Jason Rezaian ('94) – reporter for The Washington Post
 Peter Som ('89) — fashion designer

Controversy 
Marin Academy was involved in the 2019 college cheating scandal dubbed "varsity blues" where parents cheated their children into colleges. Between one and three students from Marin Academy had parents who were involved: one presumably including Todd and Diane Blake of Ross who pleaded guilty to the charges.

References

External links 
 Marin Academy website
 Archive of Academic Courses
 Homepage for Marin Academy's Conference on Democracy
 Marin Academy Voice - Student Newspaper

High schools in Marin County, California
Private high schools in California
Education in San Rafael, California
Buildings and structures in San Rafael, California
Educational institutions established in 1971
1971 establishments in California